Hattab is a surname. Notable people with the surname include:

Al-Hattab (born 1497), Tripolitanian Maliki scholar.
Ahmad Abbas Hattab (born 1994), Iraqi footballer
Dima and Lama Hattab (born 1980), Jordanian long-distance runners
Hassan Hattab (born 1967), Algerian Islamist rebel
Zineb Hattab (born 1989), Moroccan-Spanish chef